Elizabeth Edwards (1949–2010) was an attorney and author.

Elizabeth Edwards may also refer to:

 Betty Edwards (born 1926), art teacher and author
 Betty Edwards (swimmer) (1911–2009), Canadian Olympic swimmer
 Elizabeth Edwards (historian), Professor and researcher in the history of photography
 Elizabeth Edwards (politician) (born 1988), member of the New Hampshire House of Representatives
 Maudie Edwards (Elizabeth Maud Edwards, 1906–1991), actress, comedian and singer
 Elizabeth Todd Edwards (1813–1888), sister of Mary Todd Lincoln

See also
Edwards (surname)